Hidari is the Japanese word for "left-hand"

Hidari (skipper), a butterfly
Hidari (band)

People
Hidari (illustrator)
Bokuzen Hidari (左 卜全 1894–1971) Japanese actor and comedian
Hidari Jingorō (左 甚五郎) was a possibly fictitious Japanese artist, sculptor and carpenter
Sachiko Hidari (左 幸子 1930–2001) Japanese film actress

Japanese-language surnames